Sissoko is a surname, and may refer to:
Abdoul Sissoko, French-Malian footballer
Awa Sissoko, French basketball player 
Baba Sissoko, Malian musician
Ballaké Sissoko, Malian musician
Banzumana Sissoko, Malian musician
Cheick Oumar Sissoko, Malian film director
Django Sissoko, Malian politician and civil servant
Djenebou Sissoko, Malian women's basketball player
Fily Dabo Sissoko, Malian politician
Foutanga Babani Sissoko, Malian fraudster and politician
Habib Sissoko, French-Malian footballer
Ibrahim Sissoko, Ivorian footballer
Inna Sissoko Cissé, Malian stateswoman
Kamal Issah Sissoko, Ghanaian footballer
Mah Sissoko, Malian musician
Mohamed Sissoko, Malian footballer
Moussa Sissoko, French footballer
Mohamadou Sissoko, French footballer
Noé Sissoko, Malian footballer
Oumar Sissoko, Malian footballer

See also 
 Sissako